Taras Bohdanovych Levkiv (born 25 June 1940) is an honored Ukrainian artist who specializes in ceramic art.  Since the 1980s, he has been the head of the Department of Art Ceramics at Ivan Trush Lviv State College of Decorative and Fine Arts.

Life 

Taras Levkiv was born on June 25, 1940, in the village of Mala Berezovytsia, now located in Zbarazh Raion, Ternopil Oblast, Ukraine. He is the son of Bohdan Levkiv (1912-1999) and Olha Levkiv (née Omelyan) (1921-2013).
In 1964 he graduated from Lviv College of applied arts named in I. Trush (Ceramics Department). There he met his teacher Taras Dragan, with whom he would go on to develop a close relationship and the two would go on to enjoy year's of true friendship.

In 1971 he graduated from Lviv Institute of applied and decorative arts. At the end of 1970 there was his private student's exhibition in the town. The works he presented opened up new opportunities of an ancient method of potter's wheel, they had expressive ethnographic features.

He made an acquaintance with Peteris Martinson at a workshop in Dzintari (Latvia). Since that time the artist's works has been evolving as if in two directions. The first one represents bold experiments in the area of free creation which is officially forbidden in sculpture. The second one is in his ability to incarnate and carry to the spectator his own social-political persuasion in original artistic form.

In 1972 he became the first Representative from the Ukraine on ІІІ International biennale in Valorize (France). He would later go on to receive honors in competitions on artistic ceramics in Faience (Italy; 1974, 1978, 1979, 1980).

In the 1980s T. Levkiv's range of artistic interests delved into another field. Levkiv began to give his priority to cosmological themes. He presented his works at 17 private exhibitions particularly in Tbilisi, Leningrad, Ternopil and other cities. The artist has taken part in 103 regional, all-Ukrainian and international exhibitions (Tartu, Estonia; Osaka, Japan; Zheshuv, Poland; Moscow, Russia etc).

For over 20 years Taras Bohdanovych has headed the Ceramics Department in Lviv College of decorative and applied arts named in I. Trush. He was a Deputy of Lviv regional administration of the First Democratic Convocation.

Over 10 years T. Levkiv has worked at public principles as a manager of projects at the construction in Vynnyky of Autocephalous Orthodox Church of the Saint Volodymyr and the Saint Olga.

On ІІІ All-Ukrainian symposium of ceramics in Opshnae (1999) he got I honor for decorative plastic work "Bilomorcanal".

Museums of Lviv, Ternopil, Tbilisi, the Saints-Petersburg, Berlin, Prague and other cities show to their visitors the artist's works.
2. Official Taras Levkiv Website

References

1940 births
Living people
Ukrainian artists
People from Ternopil Oblast